Beckford refers to:

Beckford, Worcestershire, a village in England
 Beckford (Princess Anne, Maryland), listed on the NRHP in Maryland
Beckford (surname), people with the surname Beckford

See also
Beckford's Tower, an architectural folly in Bath, England